Voisper (stylized in all caps) was a South Korean vocal group formed in Incheon. It consisted of vocalists Daegwang, Kwangho, Kangsan, and Choonggi, all of whom became friends in high school. After auditioning on Superstar K6 in 2014 as North Incheon Nineteen, the group was signed to Evermore Music the following January. A portmanteau of the words "voice" and "whisper", the quartet released its first mini-album Voice + Whisper in November 2016.  The group disbanded of December 8, 2021 after releasing their last album The Finale.

History

2014–2016: Formation and debut
Friends since entering high school, Jung Dae-gwang, Jung Kwang-ho, Kim Kang-san, and Min Choong-gi came together during their second year. Kim proposed to make a group together, which the other three accepted. The quartet first appeared on the sixth season of Mnet's talent show series Superstar K under the name North Incheon Nineteen.

The ensemble signed a contract with Evermore Music in January 2015. To showcase its maturity since partaking in Superstar K, the group name was changed to Voisper. A portmanteau of the words "voice" and "whisper", its formation was announced on February 16, 2016, with a tentative debut towards the end of the month. The group made its first performance on SBS MTV's music program The Show on February 23, where it performed the debut single "In Your Voice". The song was made available on online music stores on March 2. Voisper released its second single "Summer Cold" on June 17. In precedence of its first mini-album, Voisper released its third single "Heart" on October 6. Voice + Whisper and the lead single "Learn to Love" were simultaneously released on November 18.

2017–2021: Wishes, The Finale, and disbandment

Voisper participated in the music competition series Immortal Songs: Singing the Legend, making its first appearance covering Kim Jong-chan's "You're Crying Too" on February 25, 2017. They went on to appear on the show a total of seven times that year, winning first place for their performance with Jung Dongha on the June 24 episode and getting their first solo win on the October 28 episode.

On July 13, Voisper released its fourth single "Crush on You". It also included a remake of the 1987 song "Days Gone By" by Yoo Jae-ha. It was followed by the group's fifth single "Save As", released on October 29. Voisper also released "Let's Not Ask" on December 4, the first installment for the original soundtrack of television series Two Cops (2017). On January 6, 2018, Voisper released the single "Missing U". Voisper 1st Whisper, the group's first concert, was held at the Veloso venue in Hongdae, Seoul, on May 12. The quartet released its first studio album Wishes in November 2018.

Voisper disbanded after releasing their final album entitled The Finale on December 8.

Musical style and influences
Voisper is primarily an R&B group, but has expressed its desire to showcase musical diversity. Its debut single "In Your Voice" is an R&B song that consists of a "dreamlike" melody, accompanied by a "sweet" piano and "powerful" drum. A ballad, the followup "Summer Cold" combines an acoustic guitar with a piano. On Voice + Whisper, the record opens with the dance track "On & On" , which incorporates modern rock and electronic music into its sound. The quartet has cited Sweet Sorrow, Noel, and Brown Eyed Soul as role models. American boy group Boyz II Men, Jung Dong-ha, and Kim Bada were also highlighted as inspirations.

Members
 Daegwang – leader, main vocalist
 Kwangho – main vocalist
 Kangsan – main vocalist
 Choonggi – main vocalist

Discography

Albums

Studio albums

Extended plays

Singles

Soundtrack appearances

Guest appearances

References

External links

 

Musical groups established in 2016
Musical groups disestablished in 2021
Musical groups from Incheon
South Korean boy bands
South Korean contemporary R&B musical groups
Superstar K participants
Vocal quartets
2016 establishments in South Korea